Nadia Davids (born in Cape Town, 1977) is a South African playwright, novelist, and author of short stories and screenplays. Her work has been published, produced, and performed in Southern Africa, Europe, and the United States. She was a Philip Leverhulme Prize winner in 2013. Her play What Remains won five Fleur du Cap Theatre Awards.

Biography
Davids was born in 1977 in Cape Town, South Africa, where she grew up. She was educated first at Zonnebloem Girls School – one of the oldest, most storied schools in the Cape located at the edge of District Six – and later at St Cyprians School.

In June 2008, she received a PhD in drama from the University of Cape Town (UCT) for her thesis entitled "Inherited Memories; Performing the Archive", which explored the history, memory and trauma of forced removals from District Six under the Group Areas Act during the Apartheid era in South Africa, through the lens of performance and a pioneering reading of Marianne Hirsch's theory of 'post memory' onto the landscape of District Six.

She held a Mellon Fellowship between 2000 and 2005, and was a visiting scholar at UC Berkeley (2001) and New York University (2004–05). She won a Philip Leverhulme Prize in 2013.

She was one of 10 playwrights participating in the New York-based Women's Project Theater’s Playwrights' Lab for 2008–10.

She took up a full-time lecturing position in the Drama Department at the Queen Mary University of London in September 2009. In 2018 she joined the University of Cape Town's English Department as an associate professor where she lectured until June 2022.

In 2017, Davids was elected president of PEN South Africa, taking over tenure from Margie Orford. In 2020 she initiated the organisation's 'The Empty Chair', a podcast that brings together South African and American writers in conversation about literature and social justice.

Works

Davids' work is disseminated through a variety of forms (journal articles, live performances, published play texts, film documentaries, a novel) to a range of audiences (commercial, academic/educational)

At Her Feet (2002–12), a one-woman show centred on Cape Muslim women's identities post 9/11 performed by acclaimed South African actor Quanita Adams, and Cissie (2008–11), a play exploring feminist biography, the historiography of District Six, and archival storytelling through the theatrical imagining of anti-apartheid activist Cissie Gool's life, serve as good examples. At Her Feet first played at the Arena Theatre in 2002 and Cissie debuted at the National Arts Festival in Grahamstown in July 2008.

Both works have garnered theatre awards and nominations (five Fleur du Cap Theatre Awards, one Noma, one Naledi), and have been staged internationally (in Africa, Europe, the United States at venues such as Market Theatre, Baxter Theatre, Southbank Centre, and at the Grahamstown National Arts Festival, Afrovibes, and the London Book Fair). The plays are studied at a range of universities (University of Cape Town, Stanford, New York University, SOAS, University of Warwick and York University) and are high-school set-works throughout South Africa. They are understood within these contexts as opening up unexpected spaces in which the lives of South African — specifically Muslim Capetonian — women, assume the central focus. At Her Feet was one of the first theatrical works to emerge in response to 9/11 and remains one of the only plays narrating the lives of Capetonian Muslim women. Described by Njabulo Ndebele as "Unforgettable... Art of the highest order," it returned to the Baxter in 2018 for its final run starring Quanita Adams.

Davids' first novel, An Imperfect Blessing, was published in April 2014 by Random House Struik-Umuzi, and in December 2014 was announced as one of three books shortlisted for the Etisalat Prize for Literature. The novel was longlisted for the Sunday Times Award and shortlisted for the UJ Prize.

Her most recent play, What Remains, about slavery, the Cape, the haunted city, and the now, was staged at the Main Festival at the Grahamstown National Arts Festival in 2017. Directed by Jay Pather, it featured Denise Newman, Faniswa Yisa, Shaun Oelf and Buhle Ngaba.
What Remains sold out at Grahamstown, went on to a sold-out run at Hiddingh Hall in Cape Town, and played at the 2017 Afrovibes Festival in Holland. What Remains was hailed as a "beautiful masterpiece" in Cape Times; it was later was nominated for seven Fleur du Cap Theatre awards and won five, including Best New South African Play, Best Director, Best Ensemble, Best Actress and Best Lighting Design. An extract of What Remains appears in Margaret Busby's 2019 anthology New Daughters of Africa.

In May 2016, Davids hosted a BBC podcast on Shakespeare in South Africa.

In 2022, the Baxter Theatre in Cape Town staged her most recent play, Hold Still, "a challenging take on issues of migrancy, as seen through the eyes of a family still haunted by the ghosts of the past.". Davids' script was described as "a work of beauty – lyrical, smart, contemporary, questioning"  and as "dramatically taut but carves a space for lyricism, with sharp exchanges of dialogue offset by poetic monologues. It is also, by turns, poignant and politically astute; it tackles current affairs head-on without pontificating or compromising the audience’s immersion in the world of the play."

Awards
 Rosalie van der Gught Award for Best New Director in 2003
 Finalist in the South Africa Pen Award adjudicated by Nobel Prize laureate J. M. Coetzee for her short story "Safe Home", and in 2009 she was placed third for "The Visit" in 2006
 Nominated for the Noma Award for her play At Her Feet in 2007
 Nominated for three Fleur du Cap Awards, including "Best New South African Play" for Cissie in 2008
 Philip Leverhulme Prize for her research on Prestwich Place, a slave-burial ground in Cape Town
 Nominated for seven Fleur du Cap Awards for What Remains in 2017. The play went on to win in five categories: Best New South African Play (Nadia Davids), Best Director (Jay Pather), Best Ensemble, Best Actress (Faniswa Yisa) and Best Lighting Design (Wilhelm Disbergan).
 2020 Olive Schreiner Prize for Drama, for What Remains: A Play in One Act

References

External links
 Nadia Davids' website

1977 births
21st-century dramatists and playwrights
21st-century South African novelists
21st-century South African women writers
Living people
South African dramatists and playwrights
South African Muslims
South African short story writers
South African women novelists
South African women short story writers
South African writers
University of Cape Town alumni
Women dramatists and playwrights
Writers from Cape Town